Kahori may refer to:

 Kahori, Azad Kashmir, a town in Pakistan
 , Japanese rower

Japanese feminine given names